Tilletia horrida, rice kernel smut, caryopsis smut, black smut, or grain smut, is a fungal rice disease believed to only affect the Oryza genus. It presents as a partial bunt.

Taxonomy
T. horrida has had a chaotic taxonomic history. It has been reclassified within Neovossia, and synonimised with congener T. barclayana. It has now been definitively de-synonymised from T. barclayana on the basis of molecular evidence.

Morphology

Teliospores
Diameter between 20 and 38 m.

Reproduction
Teliospores undergo dormancy. After 1 year, germination under perfect conditions is 50%, 15-30% normally. This is likely not due to dieoff but instead is a long-term dormancy which aids field persistence.

Distribution

History of spread
First identified in Japan in 1896, it was found throughout East, Southeast, and South Asia a few years later. First detected in the United States in 1898 in Georgetown, South Carolina, likely imported on Japanese seed rice. First detected in the Philippines in 1920, also said to be from seed rice imports.

Present distribution
T. horrida is a low-level, pervasive problem everywhere rice is grown. It is especially known from Asia, Australasia, Oceania, Greece, Belize, Cuba, Nicaragua, Panama, Trinidad, Brazil, Guyana, Suriname, Venezuela, Mexico, the United States (most severely in Arkansas, Mississippi, Missouri, and also in California, Louisiana, South Carolina, Texas), Sierra Leone. Possibly Senegal.

Disease
Long-grain cultivars are the most susceptible, short the least, and medium in between. This is a problem in the United States where most cultivation is long-grain. If seed rice is infected that is especially bad for production that uses that seed.

There are few hosts other than Oryzae. Even other grasses are non-hosts, except surprisingly for the wild wheat Aegilops sharonensis.

Economic impact
T. horrida is a low-level, pervasive problem everywhere rice is grown. Infection can also occur further back in the production chain, on seed farms. In Pakistan and China the seed infection rate is less than 25% usually, but in Pakistan 87% and China 100% have been recorded. Indian seed farmers have suffered financially at times due to the normal, low level of infection, because India has a certification system which requires a very low 0.5% maximum.

References

Fungal plant pathogens and diseases
Rice diseases
Ustilaginomycotina